The Hearts of Oak, also known as Oakboys and Greenboys, was a protest movement of farmers and weavers that arose in County Armagh, Ireland in 1761. Their grievances were the paying of ever increasing county cess, tithes, and small dues. The Hearts of Oak name came from the wearing of a piece of oak in their hats. By the end of the protests the movement had spread to the neighbouring counties of Cavan, Fermanagh, Londonderry, Monaghan, and Tyrone.

Origins and grievances
The Hearts of Oak movement started in 1761 in County Armagh, Ireland's then most populous county. The first ground of complaint was that every man was forced to give six days' work in the year and six days' work of a horse, for making or repairing roads, which the gentry often turned to their own use, while they themselves contributed nothing.

Their chief grievance appears to have been the turnpike toll gates, which they went about demolishing. In 1763 the county cess (tax) was increased to help pay for the improvements in the country's transport network which was needed due to the rapid expansion of the linen industry in Ulster. Another grievance to which the Oakboys were vehement about was the paying of the tithe to the Church of Ireland, which the state church was entitled to collect from the local population regardless of religion. Along with this was the paying of "small dues", where Catholics and Presbyterians had to pay the Church of Ireland a fee for marriages, baptisms and funerals, whether or not it occurred in their church.

Activity
There are accounts, quite possibly exaggerated, claiming some Hearts of Oak gatherings consisted of as many as 10,000 people. One account claimed that there is no town in County Armagh that could not raise four or five hundred. Whilst many members were volunteers, the Hearts of Oak frequently intimidated many others to join their ranks, though this appears to have been a community sanction. Others were attracted by the carnival-like nature of their gatherings, with companies of Oakboys displaying standards and playing drums, horns, bagpipes, and fiddles.

The main tactic of the Hearts of Oak appears to have been that once assembled, they would march to the houses of local gentlemen such as landlords, clergy, and magistrates and make them swear an oath and sign a declaration depending on the grievance. This involved the threat of violence and it is recorded that they put up gallows and threatened to hang any who refused to meet their demands. Due to the size of these Oakboy gatherings, those affected readily complied, and soon gentlemen were being summoned to public places to make their declaration, with those that failed to appear when summoned being marched upon. Despite the threatening language and symbolism they used, and most likely due to their vast numbers, they rarely, if ever, had to resort to physical violence.

The activity of the Hearts of Oak declined in County Armagh as 1763 progressed on, with their demands being met by the county magistrates. This success however is claimed as causing the movement to grow in strength in neighbouring counties. In County Londonderry, many rectors and tithe collectors had to flee to the city of Derry for protection, to which the Hearts of Oak threatened to besiege the city unless they were expelled.

End of the protests
By the middle of July 1763, the Irish government, worried by the Hearts of Oak's progress, dispatched troops to the affected counties. Whilst the mere appearance of the army was enough to disperse some Hearts of Oak, to end demonstrations and marches in other areas, they had to assert themselves. This led however to a few bloody confrontations which saw several Oakboys killed and many others arrested.

A general pardon was issued at the start of August 1763 for all Hearts of Oak who would return to their homes, and by the end of August, the Hearts of Oak had been subdued. This pardon however excluded those who had already been arrested or previously indicted, of which some would need to be the subject of "exemplary" punishment. These trials however descended into farce when only one Oakboy brought to trial was found guilty of treason and sentenced to death, with all other defendants acquitted. This may have been due to the fact the charges labelled against them were of treason, with the sole Oakboy found guilty being charged as such for treating a clergyman "very ill". Petty juries didn't like charges such as this, especially when death was the penalty, and it is suggested that the juries were made up of people who sympathised with the Hearts of Oak.

Despite some small degree of sectarianism in rhetoric, the movement as a whole consisted of aggrieved Anglicans, Presbyterians, and Roman Catholics. Though this was the case, the Church of Ireland, of which the vast majority of gentlemen belonged too, blamed the Presbyterians. The local Presbyterian churches responded with notices calling on their members to remember their loyalty and obedience to peace, whilst seeking absolution of being to blame.

See also
Agrarian society
Defenders (Ireland)
Hearts of Steel
Irish Volunteers (18th century)
Molly Maguires
Peep o' Day Boys
Orange Order
Ribbonism
United Irishmen
Whiteboys
Captain Rock

References

18th century in Ireland
Defunct organisations based in Ireland
Irish agrarian protest societies
1761 establishments in Ireland